Awara is the debut studio album of Indian singer and lyricist Arjan Dhillon. It was released on 25 November 2021 by Brown Studios. It includes 13 tracks which were produced by Yeah Proof, Mxrci, Desi Crew, Arsh Heer, Jay B Singh, and J Statik.

Background 
The album was announced by Arjan Dhillon on 17 November 2021, on his official Instagram account. On 22 November 2021, Arjan revealed the tracklist of the album on his official insatgram account which showed that it consists of 13 solo tracks without any collaboration.

Track listing

Personnel

Arjan Dhillon – Vocals, Writer, Composer (all tracks)
Mxrci - Music producer (tracks 2,5,6,10)
Yeah Proof - music producer(tracks 3,8,11,13)
Arsh Heer - music producer (tracks 1,7)
Desi Crew - music producer (track 4)
J Statik - music producer (track 9)
Jay B Singh - music producer (track 12)
Harwinder Sidhu - executive producer
Bal deo - video director (tracks 1,3,9)
Nimrat Khaira - actor (track 3)

References

Punjabi musicians
Indian male singers
Singers from Punjab, India